Tomas Piñas Bermudez (born 8 July 1982 in Granada) is a class 3 wheel chair using table tennis player from Spain. In 2012, he lived in Ogijares, Granada. He played table tennis at the 2004, 2008 and 2012 Summer Paralympics.  In 2008, he finished third in the class 3 singles table tennis game.

References

External links 
 
 

1982 births
Living people
Spanish male table tennis players
Paralympic table tennis players of Spain
Paralympic bronze medalists for Spain
Paralympic medalists in table tennis
Table tennis players at the 2004 Summer Paralympics
Table tennis players at the 2008 Summer Paralympics
Table tennis players at the 2012 Summer Paralympics
Medalists at the 2008 Summer Paralympics
Sportspeople from Granada